Echinopsis oxygona is a species of flowering plant in the cactus family Cactaceae, native to South Brazil, Uruguay and northern Argentina. Its features include: many robust spines, spherical shape, and a large flower, with sharply pointed lavender or white petals, and a fine faint scent.

Cultivation
Echinopsis oxygona is known for having huge, showy flowers at the ends of long tubes which are connected to the cactus. The flower has a sweet smell. The flower opens in the evening and wilts the next afternoon on hot days. It grows well in full sun, or light shade. Usually these are outdoor plants. They are used to the dry, desert climate, so they do not need to be watered every day.

In cultivation in the UK this plant has received the Royal Horticultural Society's Award of Garden Merit.

Propagation
On cool days it will last longer. Usually, the cactus will start to have small offsets appear at its base.  These can be plucked off and transplanted into a different pot for further growth into a mature cactus. Usually, the cactus will bloom in mid summer.

Size and growth
When buds, plants are quite small, but can grow quite fast when young.  When in a pot, the cactus may grow up to one foot. Otherwise, the cactus may grow even taller. Usually, these cacti may live for very long periods of time.

References

oxygona
Cacti of South America
Flora of Brazil
Flora of Argentina
Flora of Uruguay